"Wonderful" is a song by American rapper Ja Rule. It was released on September 27, 2004, as the lead single from his sixth studio album, R.U.L.E. (2004), through Island Def Jam and Irv Gotti's The Inc. Records. The song features American pop-R&B singers R. Kelly and Ashanti. "Wonderful" topped the UK Singles Chart, reached number five on the US Billboard Hot 100, peaked at number six in both Australia and New Zealand, and became a top-20 hit in Denmark, Germany, Ireland, the Netherlands, and Switzerland.

A remix is available on Ashanti's fourth studio album, Concrete Rose (2004), featuring an extended verse from the singer and omitting Kelly's verse. A video directed by Hype Williams was made for this single.

Commercial performance
In the United States, "Wonderful" peaked at number five on the Billboard Hot 100 in November 2004, making it Ja Rule's fourth top-five hit on the chart. In the United Kingdom, it topped the UK Singles Chart, also making it his first number one-hit in Britain, though it is the country's lowest-selling No. 1 hit with sales of only 65,000. The song has been certified gold in the United States by the Recording Industry Association of America (RIAA). It is also notable for being the last top-10 hit to date on the Hot 100 for all three artists involved. The song ended 2005 at number 94 on Billboards year-end chart.

Track listings
UK CD single
 "Wonderful"  – 4:32
 "Livin' It Up"  – 4:17
 "Always on Time"  – 4:03

European CD single
 "Wonderful"  – 4:32
 "Caught Up"  – 4:29

Australian maxi-CD single
 "Wonderful"  – 4:33
 "Caught Up"  – 4:29
 "Wonderful"  – 4:33
 "Always on Time"  – 4:03

Charts

Weekly charts

Year-end charts

Certifications

Release history

References

2004 singles
2004 songs
Ashanti (singer) songs
Def Jam Recordings singles
Ja Rule songs
R. Kelly songs
Songs written by Irv Gotti
Songs written by Ja Rule
Songs written by R. Kelly
UK Singles Chart number-one singles